Linden is a village located in central Alberta, Canada that is surrounded by Kneehill County.

The area surrounding the village was originally settled by members of the Mennonite church, and many current residents trace their heritage to this group. The first post office was opened in 1949. Linden was incorporated as a village in 1964.

Demographics 

In the 2016 Census of Population conducted by Statistics Canada, the Village of Linden recorded a population of 828 living in 306 of its 331 total private dwellings, a  change from its 2011 population of 725.

Education 
Dr. Elliot School is a K-9 school within Linden, with Kurt Ratzlaff serving as principal. The school offers a badminton team and a track & field team.

High school aged students living in Linden are given the option of attending school 10 km south of Linden, in Acme, as there is no High school in the village.

Dr. Elliott School was founded in 1958 by Dr. Elliott Harvard

See also 
List of communities in Alberta
List of villages in Alberta

References

External links

Notable people 

 Musician Mike Edel

1964 establishments in Alberta
Kneehill County
Villages in Alberta